The 2015 Asian Women’s Club Volleyball Championship was the 16th staging of the AVC Club Championships. The tournament was held in Vietnam.

Matches of the competition was held at the 7,000 capacity Hà Nam Gymnasium.

Pools composition
The teams are seeded based on their final ranking at the 2014 Asian Women's Club Volleyball Championship

* Withdrew

Pool standing procedure
The following procedures shall be followed to determine the ranking of teams in a pool:
 Number of matches won
 Match points
 Sets ratio
 Points ratio
 Result of the last match between the tied teams

Match won 3–0 or 3–1: 3 match points for the winner, 0 match points for the loser
Match won 3–2: 2 match points for the winner, 1 match point for the loser

Squads

Preliminary round

Pool A

|}

|}

Pool B

|}

|}

Final round

Quarterfinals

|}

5th–8th semifinals

|}

Semifinals

|}

7th place

|}

5th place

|}

3rd place

|}

Final

|}

Final standing

Awards

Most Valuable Player
 Pleumjit Thinkaow (Bangkok Glass)
Best Setter
 Pornpun Guedpard (Bangkok Glass)
Best Outside Spikers
 Miyu Nagaoka (Hisamitsu)
 Risa Shinnabe (Hisamitsu)

Best Middle Blockers
 Nguyễn Thị Ngọc Hoa (Bangkok Glass)
 Yang Zhou (Zhejiang)
Best Opposite Spiker
 Chen Wan-Ting (Taiwan Power)
Best Libero
 Tikamporn Changkeaw (Bangkok Glass)

Source:

References

External links
Asian Volleyball Confederation

2015 in Vietnamese women's sport
2015 in women's volleyball
International volleyball competitions hosted by Vietnam